Lance Behan (born 19 October 1942) is a former Australian rules footballer who played with Richmond and Fitzroy in the Victorian Football League (VFL).

Originally from Tasmania, Behan was cleared to Richmond in 1962.

He played two seasons with Richmond and then joined East Ballarat.

A follower, Behan won the Ballarat Football League's best and fairest award in 1964. He played briefly for Fitzroy in 1965, before returning to East Ballarat.

References

1942 births
Australian rules footballers from Tasmania
Richmond Football Club players
Fitzroy Football Club players
East Ballarat Football Club players
City-South Football Club players
Living people